Cherif Al Idrissi Airport  is an airport serving Al Hoceima, Morocco. It is the second-busiest airport in the Tanger-Tetouan-Al Hoceima region of northern Morocco. The airport is named after the 12th century CE Moroccan geographer and cartographer Al-Idrisi.

Facilities

Airlines and destinations
The following airlines operate regular scheduled and charter flights at Al Hoceima Cherif Al Idrissi Airport:

References

External links
 
 

Airports in Morocco
Buildings and structures in Tanger-Tetouan-Al Hoceima